"Good Times" is a disco soul song by American R&B band Chic from their third album Risqué (1979). It ranks 68th on Rolling Stones list of the 500 Greatest Songs of All Time, and has become one of the most sampled tunes in music history, most notably in hip hop music. Originally released with "A Warm Summer Night" on the B-side, it was reissued in 2004 with "I Want Your Love" on the B-side, a version which was certified Silver in the UK.

Lyrics and inspiration
The lyrics include a reference to Milton Ager's "Happy Days Are Here Again". It also contains lines based on lyrics featured in "About a Quarter to Nine" made famous by Al Jolson. Nile Rodgers has stated that these Great Depression-era lyrics were used as a hidden way to comment on the then-current economic conditions in the United States.

In a 2015 interview Rodgers stated that "Good Times" was partly inspired by the 1974 Kool & The Gang song "Hollywood Swinging".

Reception
Cash Box praised the "excellent production" and "bright, sassy female vocals." Record World said that "cuddly vocals, crystalline piano & production equal 'good times.'"

Chart performance
The song hit number-one on the Billboard Hot 100 on August 18, 1979, before being ousted by The Knack's smash hit "My Sharona" the following week. Along with the songs "My Forbidden Lover" and "My Feet Keep Dancing", "Good Times" reached #3 on the disco chart. It reportedly sold more than 5 million copies, making it, at the time, the best-selling 45 rpm single in the history of Atlantic Records. Billboard named "Good Times" the number one soul single of 1979.

Track listing and formats
7" vinyl single
 A. "Good Times" – 3:42
 B. "A Warm Summer Night" – 6:08

12" vinyl single
 A. "Good Times" – 8:10
 B. "A Warm Summer Night" – 6:08

Promo 12" vinyl single
 A. "Good Times" – 8:08
 B. "Good Times" – 3:42

12" 2004 reissue
 A. "Good Times" – 8:15
 B. "I Want Your Love" – 6:53

Personnel

 Vocals: Alfa Anderson
 Keyboards: Andy Schwartz
 Bass Guitar, Vocals: Bernard Edwards
 Strings: Cheryl Hong
 Vocals: Fonzi Thornton
 Strings: Karen Karlsrud
 Strings: Karen Milne
 Vocals: Luci Martin
 Vocals: Michele Cobbs
 Guitar: Nile Rodgers
 Keyboards: Raymond Jones
 Keyboards: Robert Sabino
 Percussion: Sammy Figueroa
 Drums: Tony Thompson
 Vocals: Ullanda McCullough
 Strings: Valerie Haywood
 Writers: Bernard Edwards, Nile Rodgers
 Producers: Bernard Edwards, Nile Rodgers
 Engineer: Bob Clearmountain
 Masterer: Dennis King

Charts

Weekly charts

Year-end charts

Certifications

Disco Montego version

"Good Times" was covered by Australian musicians Disco Montego, Selwyn, Katie Underwood, Peta Morris, and Jeremy Gregory and released on November 4, 2002. It was released as part of Australia's 'Rumba' music festival, which took place in November and December 2002 across Australia. The song peaked at number 52 on the ARIA Singles Chart in December 2002 in its sixth week.

Track listing
CD single
 "Good Times"
 "Good Times" (karaoke version)
 "Disco Montego Megamix"
 "Good Times" (extended mix)

Charts

Sampling and motifs
The backing track of "Good Times" was notably recreated in the Sugarhill Gang's 1979 single "Rapper's Delight", a key track in the development of hip hop. Nile Rodgers and Bernard Edwards threatened legal action over copyright, which resulted in a settlement and them being credited as co-writers. Rodgers admitted that he was originally upset with the song, but would later declare it to be "one of his favorite songs of all time" and his favorite of all the tracks that sampled Chic (the song used samples of the strings, and an interpolation of the bass line). He also stated that "as innovative and important as 'Good Times' was, 'Rapper's Delight' was just as much, if not more so." Traditionally, Chic's live performances of "Good Times" incorporate a portion of "Rapper's Delight" including audience participation call-and-response.

UK garage group Da Click's 1999 debut single "Good Rhymes" interpolated the song's bassline and chorus along with vocals from Luther Vandross' "Never Too Much".

References

External links
 chictribute.com: Chic Emulators
 

1979 songs
1979 singles
Chic (band) songs
Disco Montego songs
Selwyn (singer) songs
2002 singles
Billboard Hot 100 number-one singles
Cashbox number-one singles
Songs written by Bernard Edwards
Songs written by Nile Rodgers
Song recordings produced by Nile Rodgers
Song recordings produced by Bernard Edwards
Atlantic Records singles
Warner Music Group singles